Wanton Spirit is a studio album by the American jazz pianist Kenny Barron, with drummer Roy Haynes and bassist Charlie Haden. The album was released in 1994 on the Verve Records label. Wanton Spirit was nominated for a 1996 Grammy Award for Best Jazz Instrumental Performance.

Reception
In his review on AllMusic, Lee Bloom noted: "Wanton Spirit further establishes him as a leader and teams him with bebop legend Roy Haynes on drums and Charlie Haden on bass. The early influences of Tatum, Powell, Monk, plus the melodic lines of Tommy Flanagan, the pentatonic harmony of McCoy Tyner, and the rhythmic fluidity of Herbie Hancock have all been thoroughly absorbed by Barron." The Chicago Tribune critic Howard Reich wrote: "Though admired among connoisseurs, pianist Kenny Barron never has attained the acclaim he deserves. Perhaps his playing is a bit too subtle and introverted to reach a wide public, or perhaps his timing was off, since he arrived on the scene after the great legends of the '40s and '50s but before the young lions of the '80s. In any event, his name still signals first-rate pianism, as his recent release, Wanton Spirit, proves." The Los Angeles Times reviewer Bill Kohlhaase stated: "Wanton Spirit makes up for Barron's near-miss recordings of the last few years while painting a more honest picture of his skills. It's an album that, finally, should bring him the accolades he deserves."

Track listing

Personnel
Band
Kenny Barron – piano
Charlie Haden – bass
Roy Haynes – drums

Production
Jean-Philippe Allard – executive producer
Carol Friedman – photography
Alain Gerber – liner notes
Joanne Klein – producer
Didier Marc – mastering
Joe Marciano – engineer

References

External links

Kenny Barron albums
1994 albums
Verve Records live albums